The Institute for the Public Understanding of the Past (IPUP) is an interdisciplinary research centre at the University of York, established in 2006. The institute works as an outward-facing body to create a sustainable network of partnerships between the academic environment and those working in museums and galleries, other heritage practitioners, and media professionals. It also conducts research into the ways in which the past is presented in the media to a mass audience for the purposes of education and entertainment, and into how audiences more generally comprehend and interact with the past. IPUP organises regular conferences and research seminars. It also runs an internship programme for postgraduate students.

In 2012 IPUP established a new MA in Public History, which includes two core modules, one optional module and an assessed placement module hosted by external partners. It also hosts a number of PHD students.

IPUP is based on the University of York's main Heslington campus,  Vanbrugh College. It is hosted by the Department of History.  Its Director in 2015-2016, is Dr. Geoff Cubitt, a Reader in the Department of History, whose research interests are in social memory and in the political, social and cultural aspects of relationships to the past in modern societies more generally.

Past Directors.
2006-2011 Professor Helen Weinstein, a specialist in media production.
2012-2015 Professor Sarah Rees Jones, a medievalist and specialist in the history of York.

External links
Institute for the Public Understanding of the Past
Humanities Research Centre
The University of York

University of York
History organisations based in the United Kingdom